The Imperial Diversion Dam (National ID # CA10159) is a concrete slab and buttress, ogee weir structure across the California/Arizona border,  northeast of Yuma. Completed in 1938, the dam retains the waters of the Colorado River into the Imperial Reservoir before desilting and diversion into the All-American Canal and the Gila Project aqueduct. Between 1932 and 1940, the Imperial Irrigation District (IID) relied on the Inter-California Canal and the Imperial Canal and Alamo River.

Background
The Imperial Dam was built with three sections; the gates of each section hold back the water to help divert the water towards the desilting plant. Three giant desilting basins and seventy-two 770 ft (230 m) scrapers hold and desilt the water; the removed silt is carried away by six sludge-pipes running under the Colorado River that dump the sediment into the California sluiceway, which returns the silt to the Colorado River. The water is now directed back towards one of the three sections which divert the water into one of the three channels. About 90% of the volume of the Colorado River is diverted into the canals at this location.

The Gila project aqueduct branches off towards Arizona while the All-American canal branches southwards for 37 miles (60 km) before reaching its headworks on the California border and bends west towards the Imperial Valley.

References

External links

 
 From the Colorado River to the Salton Sea: The story of Imperial Valley's Water (slideshow)

Dams in Arizona
Dams in California
Dams of the Lower Colorado River Valley
Buildings and structures in Imperial County, California
Buildings and structures in Yuma County, Arizona
United States Bureau of Reclamation dams
Dams completed in 1938
Dams on the Colorado River